Vrigny is a former commune in the Orne department in north-western France. In 2015 it became part of Boischampré.

See also
Communes of the Orne department
Parc naturel régional Normandie-Maine

References

Former communes of Orne